Hinds County Agricultural High School or Hinds Agricultural High School (HAHS) was a public secondary school in unincorporated Hinds County, Mississippi, United States, south of Utica. It was located on the Utica campus of Hinds Community College until its 2014 closure. Hinds County AHS was one of three independently functioning agricultural high schools in the state of Mississippi.

The community college district operated the high school.

History
In 2012 the Mississippi Board of Education published a report recommending the closure of Hinds AHS. Augenblick, Palaich and Associates, the report's author, stated that enrollment was declining at Hinds, that it had among the lowest levels of academic performance, and that it no longer had a focus on agriculture.

Hinds AHS closed on July 1, 2014. According to state law, its real property was to be given to Hinds Community College and its personal property was to be given to the Hinds County School District. On July 1, 2015 its property was transferred to the Hinds County School District.

Athletics
In 2014 the boys' track team won the third Class 1A championship of the MHSAA; this occurred just prior to the disestablishment of the school.

Demographics

200607 school year
There were a total of 222 students enrolled at Hinds County Agricultural High School during the 200607 school year. The gender makeup of the school was 52% female and 48% male. The racial makeup of the school was 99.55% African American and 0.45% White. 78.2% of the school's students were eligible to receive free lunch.

Previous school years

Accountability statistics

See also

Coahoma Agricultural High School
Forrest County Agricultural High School
List of high schools in Mississippi
List of school districts in Mississippi

References

External links
 

Public high schools in Mississippi
Schools in Hinds County, Mississippi
Agricultural schools
Educational institutions disestablished in 2014
2014 disestablishments in Mississippi